Persia White (born October 25, 1972) is a Bahamas-born American actress, singer and musician. White is known for her role as Denise Williams on the short-lived television series Breaker High and as Lynn Searcy on the UPN/CW sitcom Girlfriends. White is also a member of the band XEO3, and a solo singer who released her debut album Mecca in 2009. She is also known for her role as Abby Bennett Wilson in The Vampire Diaries (2012-2017).

Early life
White was born in Nassau, Bahamas and was one of four children to an Irish-American mother and a Bahamian father, thus making her a Bahamian actress. Her early years were spent in the Bahamas. White's father was paralyzed in a car accident when she was three, and he later moved to Miami to seek better medical care. White's mother moved with her children to South Florida two years later but did not reunite with White's father. White later joined the Miami Coconut Grove Children's Theater. As a teen, she studied dance, acting, singing, and painting. After high school, White signed with the Ford Agency and obtained her Screen Actors Guild card. She then moved to Los Angeles to pursue a career in acting.

Career
White has appeared in various independent films, including Red Letters (opposite Peter Coyote) and the cult horror Blood Dolls. She starred in the made-for-TV movies Operation Sandman, opposite Ron Perlman, and Suddenly, opposite Kirstie Alley. Her television work includes appearances on Angel, NYPD Blue, The Steve Harvey Show, Brooklyn South, Buffy the Vampire Slayer, as well as regular roles on Breaker High with co-star Ryan Gosling, Sister Sister as Anya and Girlfriends as Lynn. In 2008, White appeared in The Fall of Night in the role of Dawn. She can also be seen in Chrisette Michele's video for "Be OK".

In addition to acting, White also co-produced the award-winning documentary Earthlings, narrated by Joaquin Phoenix. In July 2011, White won the award for Best Performance by an Actor in the American Black Film Festival for her work in Dysfunctional Friends. She also appeared as Bonnie's mother on The Vampire Diaries in a semi-recurring role.

In 2019, she reunited with her Girlfriends co-stars Tracee Ellis Ross, Jill Marie Jones, and Golden Brooks in an episode of the ABC comedy series Black-ish.

Personal life
White is a vegan, a human and animal rights advocate, and environmentalist. She was honored by PETA as a 2005 Humanitarian of the Year.
She is a board member for the Sea Shepherd Conservation Society.

White has a daughter, Mecca Morgan White, born .

On February 29, 2008, White became engaged to singer Saul Williams, her boyfriend of five years, and married in 2008. They met in 2003 when he made a guest appearance on the TV show Girlfriends. On January 17, 2009, White announced via her Myspace blog that she and Williams were no longer together.

After three years of dating, White married fellow Vampire Diaries actor Joseph Morgan in Ocho Rios, Jamaica on July 5, 2014, after which, he adopted her daughter and they had her legal name changed to Mecca Morgan White.

Filmography

Film

Television

Award nomination

Music

Mecca is Persia White's debut album. It was released digitally on October 31, 2009, and on CD on December 8, 2009. The title comes from the name of White's daughter. The final three songs on the album were all featured in several episodes of Girlfriends.

"Wanting" – 3:58
"Perfect" – 3:15
"Receive" (featuring Saul Williams) – 4:15
"Pressed Against Gods Thoughts" – 2:02
"Haunt" – 3:02
"2 Sea" – 1:23
"Danger" (featuring Saul Williams) – 3:25
"Salvation" – 4:57
"Tease" (featuring Tricky) – 3:22
"Choices" (Girlfriends season 6 finale song) – 2:47
"Past Mistakes" (featuring Tricky) – 4:10

References

External links

 
 
 Persia White Interview on The Gregory Mantell Show

Living people
1972 births
21st-century African-American women singers
20th-century American actresses
21st-century American actresses
21st-century American singers
21st-century American women singers
Actresses from Florida
African-American actresses
African-American female models
African-American models
20th-century African-American women singers
American environmentalists
American film actresses
American people of Bahamian descent
American television actresses
American women environmentalists
Bahamian actresses
Bahamian people of American descent
Bahamian emigrants to the United States
Bahamian people of Irish descent
Female models from Florida
People from Nassau, Bahamas
Trip hop musicians